Berry Glacier is an Antarctic glacier, about  long and  wide, draining north between Perry Range and Demas Range into the Getz Ice Shelf on the coast of Marie Byrd Land. This vicinity was first photographed and rudely charted from aircraft of the U.S. Antarctic Service in December 1940, and the glacier was mapped in detail by the U.S. Geological Survey from ground surveys and from U.S. Navy air photos, 1959–66. It was named by the Advisory Committee on Antarctic Names for Commander William H. Berry, U.S. Navy, Air Operations Officer for Task Force 43 during Operation Deep Freeze 1969–72; Operations Officer, 1973.

There are seven volcanic nunataks along the east side of the glacier.

See also
 List of glaciers in the Antarctic
 List of Antarctic ice streams
 Glaciology

References

 

Glaciers of Marie Byrd Land